The Irish Second–Level Students' Union (ISSU) is Ireland's national umbrella body for second-level students working through the student council network in second-level schools. ISSU represents post-primary school students nationwide.

ISSU's activities have three stated strands: it aims to provide training, guidance and advice to students and to equip them with the skills needed to become involved in the decision-making processes in their own school communities; and it aims to work with other organisations to bring the views of secondary school students to the attention of policy-makers and the media; and it aims to provide services to the membership of ISSU on the principle that control of those services lies with the membership.

ISSU was founded in August 2008, from the remains of the Union of Secondary Students (USS) which had been in existence from 2001 to 2008. It is a member of the Organising Bureau of European School Student Unions (OBESSU) and the National Youth Council of Ireland.

During September 2009, ISSU modified its name from the Irish Secondary Students' Union to the Irish Second–Level Students' Union to encompass all Irish post-primary schools.

Students in Northern Ireland are represented by the Secondary Students' Union of Northern Ireland (SSUNI).

References

External links

OBESSU

Student organisations in the Republic of Ireland